Kariavattom Sastha Temple is a Hindu temple located in Kariavattom in Thiruvananthapuram district of Kerala state, India. The temple is dedicated to lord Ayyappa and it lies on the NH-49 (Kanyakumari-Salem highway), about 13 km from Thiruvananthapuram city.

References 

Hindu temples in Thiruvananthapuram district